So Glad I Know is the first gospel album by American R&B singer Deniece Williams, released in 1986 on Sparrow Records. This is Williams' first full-length gospel album. On Williams' previous albums, she would include a gospel song, such as "Whiter Than Snow" from Let's Hear It for the Boy and "I Believe in Miracles" from Niecy. Those two songs and many others from previous and subsequent releases were compiled into an album of gospel material called From the Beginning (1990). One of the gospel tracks "They Say", originally from Williams' 1983 album I'm So Proud, featured a duet with Earth, Wind & Fire lead singer Philip Bailey. This new recording features a duet with American Christian singer Sandi Patti, for which they won a Grammy Award for Best Gospel Performance by a Duo or Group. Williams also won a Grammy for Best Soul Gospel Performance, Female for her rendition of the gospel hymn "I Surrender All" at the 29th Annual Grammy Awards. So Glad I Know reached number 6 on the Top Christian Albums and number 7 on the Top Gospel Albums charts in Billboard magazine.

Track listing

Charts

Radio singles

Accolades
Grammy Awards

References

1986 albums
Deniece Williams albums
Sparrow Records albums